Parkside Community School, Chesterfield, England
 Parkside Elementary, Indiana, USA
 Parkside Elementary School (disambiguation), various, USA
 Parkside High School, Maryland, USA 
 Parkside High School, Dundas, Ontario, Canada
 Parkside Middle School, Cramlington, England
 Parkside Primary School, Adelaide, Australia

See also
 Parkside Academy
 Parkside Collegiate Institute
 Parkside Community College
 Parkside Studio College
 University of Wisconsin–Parkside
 Parkside (disambiguation)